Lilesville is a town in Anson County, North Carolina, United States. The population was 404 at the 2020 census.

History
A post office called Lilesville has been in operation since 1827. The town was named for an early merchant.

Geography
Lilesville is located at  (34.967101, -79.985663). It is approximately six miles east of Wadesboro, the county seat.

Geology 
Lilesville is home to the Lilesville Granite, a porphyritic igneous rock named for the town.

Demographics

As of the census of 2000, there were 459 people, 186 households, and 129 families residing in the town. The population density was 460.1 people per square mile (177.2/km2). There were 202 housing units at an average density of 202.5 per square mile (78.0/km2). The racial makeup of the town was 52.07% White, 47.49% African American, 0.22% Native American, and 0.22% from two or more races. Hispanic or Latino of any race were 0.22% of the population.

There were 186 households, out of which 28.0% had children under the age of 18 living with them, 50.0% were married couples living together, 15.6% had a female householder with no husband present, and 30.6% were non-families. 29.0% of all households were made up of individuals, and 12.4% had someone living alone who was 65 years of age or older. The average household size was 2.47 and the average family size was 3.04.

In the town, the population was spread out, with 24.4% under the age of 18, 8.3% from 18 to 24, 25.1% from 25 to 44, 24.0% from 45 to 64, and 18.3% who were 65 years of age or older. The median age was 40 years. For every 100 females, there were 82.9 males. For every 100 females age 18 and over, there were 86.6 males.

The median income for a household in the town was $29,167, and the median income for a family was $40,000. Males had a median income of $30,179 versus $21,250 for females. The per capita income for the town was $14,099. About 11.9% of families and 13.0% of the population were below the poverty line, including 12.8% of those under age 18 and 30.4% of those age 65 or over.

In the media
Steven Spielberg filmed The Color Purple mostly in Lilesville, and a large white farmhouse (the James Bennett Plantation, which is an old farmhouse located a few miles off Highway 74) was used extensively as the main exterior location in that film. Most of the town scenes were done in nearby Marshville, a small town in Union County directly to the west of Anson County; the store is an actual store called Apple Jacks and dirt was laid over pavement during filming.

References

External links
Town of Lilesville official website
The Anson County News website

Towns in Anson County, North Carolina
Towns in North Carolina
Populated places established in 1827